Nombu kanji is a porridge of moong dal, rice, and coconut milk originating from Kadayanallur, Tamil Nadu, India. It is made during Ramadan to break the fast in the evening. As a nutritious and easy meal, it is prepared in bulk during Ramadan. It is served to all in the area who visit or pass by the mosque.

References 

Indian cuisine
Tamil cuisine